The 1983 Tampa Bay Rowdies indoor season was the ninth indoor season of the team's existence. The Rowdies captured the Indoor Grand Prix title. Although they would play for another 10 years, including two more indoors in 1983–84 and 1986–87, this would be the final trophy won by the original club.

Overview
Nearly all of the NASL teams opted out of participating in a full 1982–83 indoor season. Four clubs (Fort Lauderdale Strikers, Montreal Manic, Tulsa Roughnecks and Tampa Bay) played in a scaled down indoor tournament called the Grand Prix of Indoor Soccer. In this format each team would play a total of eight times, consisting of three weeks of double round-robin play, followed by a seeded "championship weekend" of matches.

A four-week long "shootout challenge" competition sponsored by Molson beer, was also played each match day, with the overall winners splitting a $5,000 purse on the final day.

Overall Tampa Bay fared well in the round-robin stage with a 4–2 record and 42 points. However, both losses were to Montreal who had finished with an identical record and points. The Manic earned the number one seed based on the head-to-head tiebreaker. This paired Tampa Bay up with the 3–3 Roughnecks for the semifinals. The Rowdies defeated Tulsa, 8–6, with a third quarter barrage that eventually turned a one-goal deficit into a three-goal cushion. That victory earned them a rematch with Montreal for the Grand Prix title.

In the championship final, "Le Manic" and the Rowdies battled back and forth into double overtime at the Montreal Forum. The visitors gained a 2–0 advantage, before Dale Mitchell put Montreal in the lead with a second period hat-trick. Each team added a goal in the third quarter. Tampa Bay continued to trail for most of the fourth until Zequinha tied the match with 1:55 remaining to send it to sudden death overtime. The first extra session failed to produce a golden goal, but with just under two minutes lapsed in the second overtime Mark Karpun beat his defender down the left wing. He then tucked a shot past Manic goalie, Mehdi Cerbah, inside the far post for the game winner and the Rowdies' third indoor trophy.

Combined with their 4–0 record in friendlies, the Tampa Bay Rowdies completed their winter 1983 indoor schedule with a record of 10–2 in all matches. The Rowdies also won the finals of the $5,000 shootout challenge against Fort Lauderdale. In that event, goalie Jürgen Stars stopped all five Strikers' shots, while Wes McLeod and Hugo Perez converted their attempts for a 2–0 victory.

Club 
The team's winter roster saw numerous changes over the course of the brief indoor season. Goalkeeper, Tom Boric was lost for the remainder of the indoor season after a knee injury in the Rowdies' second grand prix match on January 22. Defender, Mike Connell was only able to appear in one match because of a nagging Achilles injury. With Connell injured, Wes McLeod served as team captain for the 12-game indoor season Brazilian indoor specialist Tatu did not arrive from São Paulo FC until January 28, because of transfer issues, and missed the first four games. Peter Roe missed the final six matches with a broken toe.

Around the same time the NASL began the ill-fated Team America experiment. The February try-outs for Team America overlapped with the Grand Prix schedule and as a result Arnie Mausser, Pedro DeBrito, Perry Van der Beck and Glenn Myernick became unavailable to the Rowdies for several games including the semifinal and championship matches. This forced the Tampa Bay coach, Al Miller to use rookies and reserve team players more often.

Roster

Management and technical staff 
 George W. Strawbridge, Jr., owner
 Lamar Hunt, co-owner
 Bill McNutt, co-owner
 Ted Moore, general manager
 Francisco Marcos, director of player personal 
 Al Miller, head coach
 Ken Shields, trainer
 Alfredo Beronda, equipment manager

Honors 
NASL Grand Prix of Indoor Soccer: Champions
Grand Prix assists leader: Wes McLeod (12)

Competitions

Friendlies
The Rowdies participated in and won four friendlies. The first was played at Reunion Arena in Dallas against Tulsa. Three days before the grand prix began they faced Tulsa again at Oklahoma City's Myriad Arena. A mid-grand prix friendly pitted the club against Montreal at the Bayfront Center on January 29. Finally, in-state rival, Fort Lauderdale, met Tampa Bay at the Lakeland Civic Center in a post-tournament fixture, to close out the Rowdies' abbreviated 1983 indoor campaign.

Grand Prix round-robin table
G = Games, W = Wins, L = Losses, GF = Goals For, GA = Goals Against, GD = Goal Differential, PTS= point system

6 points awarded for a win.
Beginning with the fourth goal, 1 bonus point awarded for each goal scored.
Maximum of 5 bonus points per game.

*Montreal wins top seed based on 2–0 head-to-head record vs. Tampa Bay.

Grand Prix Championship rounds

Match reports

Statistics

Scoring
GP = Games Played, G = Goals (worth 2 points), A = Assists (worth 1 point), Pts = Points

Goalkeeping
Note: GP = Games played; Min = Minutes played; SV = Saves; GA = Goals against; GAA = Goals against average; W = Wins; L = Losses

Player movement

See also 
 1983 team indoor stats

References 

1983 indoor
Tampa Bay Rowdies (1975–1993) seasons
Tampa Bay Rowdies
Tampa Bay Rowdies
Tampa Bay Rowdies
Tampa Bay Rowdies
Sports in St. Petersburg, Florida